The Nissan is a 200 km long river in southwest Sweden. It ends in the Kattegat bay of the North Sea in Halmstad. The straight middle and upper course of Nissan follows a branch of the Protogine Zone – a zone of crustal weakness in western Sweden. Nissan drains the western part of the South Småland peneplain.

References

Rivers of Halland County
Götaland